Babolat  is a French tennis, badminton, and padel equipment company, headquartered in Lyon, best known for its strings and tennis racquets which are used by professional and recreational players worldwide. The company has made strings since 1875, when Pierre Babolat created the first strings made of natural gut. Babolat continued to focus on strings until 1994, when it became a "total tennis" company, producing also racquet frames and selling them in Europe. It then expanded sales to Japan, and later to the United States in 2000. Sales of Babolat racquets increased rapidly in North America and Europe. Babolat is also a pioneer in connected sport technology and launched a connected tennis racket in 2014 and a connected wrist-worn tennis wearable with PIQ in 2015. The Babolat Pop is used worldwide, and one of the leaders in tennis sensors.

Sponsorships

Men 
Source:
 

  Federico Delbonis
  Thanasi Kokkinakis (to 2021)
  Jordan Thompson
  Dominic Thiem
  Thiago Monteiro
  Félix Auger-Aliassime
  Cristian Garín
  Carlos Alcaraz
  Rafael Nadal
  Albert Ramos Viñolas
  Stéphane Houdet
  Benoît Paire
  Cameron Norrie
  Fabio Fognini
  Taro Daniel
  Yūichi Sugita
  Evgeny Donskoy
  Mikael Ymer
  Ryan Harrison 
  Sam Querrey
  Jack Sock
  Luke Watson
  Shitong "Allan" Mi

Women 

  Samantha Stosur (to 2018)
  Kirsten Flipkens
  Elise Mertens (to 2018)
  Yanina Wickmayer
  Eugenie Bouchard (to 2018)
  Leylah Fernandez
  Wang Xinyu
  Zheng Saisai
  Ana Konjuh
  Karolína Plíšková
  Kristýna Plíšková
  Garbiñe Muguruza
  Anett Kontaveit
  Alizé Cornet
  Heather Watson
  Sara Errani
  Camila Giorgi (to 2021)
  Yulia Putintseva
  Magda Linette (to 2022)
  Anastasia Pavlyuchenkova (to 2014)
  Amanda Anisimova (to 2022)
  Jennifer Brady
  Danielle Collins
  Sofia Kenin

Retired players

  Mariano Puerta
  Samuel Groth
  Kim Clijsters
  Fernando González
  Li Na
  Peng Shuai
  Mirjana Lučić-Baroni
  Caroline Wozniacki
  Carlos Moyá
  Pauline Parmentier
  Jo-Wilfried Tsonga
  Johanna Konta
  Julia Görges
  Francesca Schiavone
  Agnieszka Radwańska
  Nadia Petrova
  Dinara Safina
  Elena Vesnina
  Viktor Troicki
  Timea Bacsinszky
  Dominika Cibulková
  Catherine "CiCi" Bellis
  Andy Roddick

References

External links
 

Tennis equipment manufacturers
Badminton equipment manufacturers
Sporting goods manufacturers of France
Companies established in 1875
Sport in Lyon
Manufacturing companies based in Lyon
1875 establishments in France
French brands
Sportswear brands